Glutamate [NMDA] receptor subunit epsilon-3 is a protein that in humans is encoded by the GRIN2C gene.

Function 

N-methyl-D-aspartate (NMDA) receptors are a class of ionotropic glutamate receptors.  NMDA channel has been shown to be involved in long-term potentiation, an activity-dependent increase in the efficiency of synaptic transmission thought to underlie certain kinds of memory and learning.  NMDA receptor channels are heteromers composed of the key receptor subunit NMDAR1 (GRIN1) and 1 or more of the 4 NMDAR2 subunits: NMDAR2A (GRIN2A), NMDAR2B (GRIN2B), NMDAR2C (GRIN2C), and NMDAR2D (GRIN2D).

Interactions 

GRIN2C has been shown to interact with DLG4 and DLG3.

See also 
 Glutamate receptor
 NMDA receptor

References

Further reading

External links 
 

Ionotropic glutamate receptors